Tsing Yi South is one of the 31 constituencies of the Kwai Tsing District Council. The seat elects one member of the council every four years. It was first created in the 1985 elections. Its boundary is loosely based on the southern part of Tsing Yi including residential areas such as Cheung Wang Estate, Mounts Haven, Rambler Crest and Tsing Yi South Industrial Area.

Councillors represented

Election results

2010s

2000s

1990s

1980s

Citations

References
2011 District Council Election Results (Kwai Tsing)
2007 District Council Election Results (Kwai Tsing)
2003 District Council Election Results (Kwai Tsing)

Constituencies of Hong Kong
Constituencies of Kwai Tsing District Council
1985 establishments in Hong Kong
Constituencies established in 1985
Tsing Yi